Lake Health, formerly Lake Hospital System, is a system of hospitals and health care facilities throughout Lake County, Cuyahoga County and Geauga County, Ohio, United States. Lake Health changed its name from Lake Hospital System on June 12, 2009. On April 16, 2021, the Lake Health system became part of University Hospitals.

Facilities

 TriPoint Medical Center – Concord Township 
 LakeWest Medical Center – Willoughby 
 Mentor Medical Campus – Mentor 
 Madison Medical Campus – Madison 
 Chardon Medical Campus – Chardon 
 Willowick Medical Campus – Willowick 
 Tyler Urgent Care Center – Mentor 
 Rehabilitation & Wellness – Mentor 
 Mentor Wellness Campus – Mentor 
Beachwood Medical Center – Beachwood 40°44'30"N 73°59'21"W 
Concord Continuing Care - Concord

Former facilities
 LakeEast Hospital - Painesville (closed 2009, demolished 2011)
Painesville Quick Care Center – Painesville

References

External links
 

Healthcare in Ohio
Hospital networks in the United States
Lake County, Ohio
Medical and health organizations based in Ohio